Zotico is an Italian male given name.

Variations in other languages
Catalan: Zòtic
French: Zotique
Ancient Greek: Ζωτικος (Zotikos)
Latin: Zoticus
Lithuanian: Zotikas 
Polish: Zotyk
Portoguese: Zótico
Spanish: Zotico

Origins and diffusion 
The name originates with the Latin variant  Zoticus, which is based on its ancient Greek version: Ζωτικος (Zotikos); originally ζωτικος (zotikos), which means "full of life" or "life-giving". Hence the name shares a common root with the names Zosimo, Zoilo and Zoe, and therefore has a similar meaning to the name Vitale.

The name, in Italian, coincides with the term "zotico", which means "villain", "rough", "ignorant", "rude". Etymologists speculate that the name's meaning is related to "idiot".

People 
 Aurelio Avito Zotico, lover of Eligabalus
 Zotico (prefect of the praetorium), official of the Eastern Roman Empire
 Zotico of Constantinople, Roman saint
 Zotico of Nicomedia, Roman saint

Name-day
Several saints have the name Zotico, hence the name-day can be celebrated on any of the following dates:
12 January, san Zotico, martyr of Tivoli
12 January, san Zotico, soldier and martyr with his comrades; Castolo, Modesto and Rogato as well as others during their services for the Church in Africa
10 February, san Zotico, martyr with Amanzio and other priestes in Rome
11 February, san Zotico, martyr in Africa
21 July, san Zotico, bishop of Comana of Armenia and martyr
21 August, san Zotico, martyr with Agatonico and others in Selymbria (Tracia)
21 October, Zotico of Nicomedia, soldier and martyr with Caio, Dasio and others in Nicomedia
23rd December, san Zotico, martyr in Gortyna
31st December, Zotico Of Constantinoples, priest and martyr in Constantinople

References